Mij may refer to:
 Mij, Iran (disambiguation)
 Jim Holmberg, American singer-songwriter who recorded under the name Mij